209 Woodland Drive is a house in Plains, Georgia, United States, which has since 1960 been the home of Jimmy Carter, who was President of the United States from 1977 to 1981, and his wife Rosalynn. It is the only house that the Carters have owned; they have occupied it since 1961.

The house was built by the Carters in 1960; work was subsequently carried out on the house in 1974 and 1981. The Carters knocked down a wall at the house themselves during remodelling of the house in the 2010s. Rosalynn Carter described the work of knocking down the wall as "second-nature" due to the couple's extensive work with the charity Habitat for Humanity. The house was built to accommodate the Carters' growing family, they had three young sons, James, Donnel, and Jack, at the time of its construction. It had four bedrooms at the time of its construction in 1960. It is one story in height.

The Historic American Buildings Survey describes the house as a "modest 1960s ranch-style house". In a 2018 profile of the Carters' life in Plains for The Washington Post, Kevin Sullivan and Mary Jordan described the house as "dated, but homey and comfortable".

A pond in the grounds of the house was personally dug by Jimmy Carter; it is used by him for fly fishing. A Magnolia tree in the grounds of the house was grown from a tree on the lawn of the White House that was planted by President Andrew Jackson.

The Carters intend to be buried in the grounds of the house by a willow tree on the lawn of the property. The home is part of Jimmy Carter National Historical Park but is not open to the public. The deed to the house has been granted to the National Park Service (NPS) who will turn the house into a museum and open to public tours after the couple's deaths.

The fence that surrounds the house originally surrounded the residence of President Richard Nixon in Key Biscayne in Florida.

The Carters have been actively involved in planning the future museum; their involvement as living participants in a presidential home museum project is unique. Future tours would include the pool, tennis courts and back patio of the house; new paths and benches would be constructed. Jimmy Carter's wood shop would also be on display. The NPS plans to make the proposed museum of the house reflect the couple's use of the residence "as a place for both refuge and recreation". The garden will be managed along environmental principles to reflect Rosalynn Carter's interest in a pollinator garden.

See also
 List of residences of presidents of the United States

References

External links
National Park Service - Jimmy Carter National Historic Site

Houses completed in 1960
Houses in Sumter County, Georgia
Jimmy Carter
National Park Service areas in Georgia (U.S. state)
Presidential homes in the United States